Franklin Special School District (FSSD) is a school district in Franklin, Tennessee, United States. The district includes 3,850 students attending eight schools for grades K–8. After completing eighth grade, students attend a Williamson County Schools high school (Franklin and Centennial).

The boundary includes the majority of Franklin.

Schools

Elementary Schools (K–4) 
 Franklin Elementary
 Johnson Elementary
 Liberty Elementary
 Moore Elementary
 Poplar Grove Elementary

Middle Schools (5–8) 
 Freedom Intermediate (5–6)
 Freedom Middle (7–8)
 Poplar Grove Middle (5–8)

References 

Franklin, Tennessee
Education in Williamson County, Tennessee
School districts in Tennessee